Stary Artaul (İśke Artawıl) is a rural locality (a selo) in Bayguzinsky Selsoviet, Yanaulsky District, Bashkortostan, Russia. The population was 209 as of 2010. There are 2 streets.

Geography 
Stary Artaul is located 15 km west of Yanaul (the district's administrative centre) by road. Nokrat is the nearest rural locality.

References 

Rural localities in Yanaulsky District